The 2013 American Ultimate Disc League season was the second season for the league. Each team played a 16-game schedule. The Toronto Rush won the AUDL Championship II over the Madison Radicals in Chicago, IL. The Rush completed the first undefeated season in AUDL history, going 16-0 in the regular season and winning both playoff games.

Offseason

Relocation
 The Bluegrass Revolution relocated to from Lexington, Kentucky to Cincinnati, Ohio due to poor attendance

Contraction

Standings

Eastern Division

Midwestern Division

 T indicates top seed in the playoffs. P indicates a team advanced to the playoffs

Playoffs

References

American Ultimate Disc League
2013 in American sports